Cambodia Bayon Airlines  was an airline based in Phnom Penh, Cambodia. Its main hub was at Phnom Penh International Airport. The airline was a wholly owned subsidiary of Bayon Airlines Holding Ltd., which was in turn a subsidiary of the Chinese carrier Joy Air. It was registered in April 2014.  The air operator's certificate was received in December 2014; the airline had its inaugural flight on December 31, 2014. Cambodia Bayon Airlines' first operational base in Cambodia was Phnom Penh. The company also had operational bases in Siem Reap, Sihanoukville and Ho Chi Minh City.  The company slogan was For You. With You. About You.

History

Cambodia Bayon Airlines was born in 2014 from the wish to invest in Cambodia's growing aviation market, based on the expertise of Chinese carrier Joy Air and aircraft manufacturer AVIC Aviation Industry Corporation of China.

17 April 2014: Establishment of Cambodia Bayon Airlines, in Phnom Penh, Cambodia

21 August 2014: Planning approval from the Prime Minister's Office, of the Kingdom of Cambodia

15 December 2014: Delivery of Bayon Airlines' first MA60 aircraft

30 December 2014: First scheduled flight, between Phnom Penh and Siem Reap

12 April 2015: Launch of domestic flights to Sihanoukville (city)

1 July 2015: Launch of international flights to Ho Chi Minh City, Vietnam

In 2019, the airline ceased all operations.

Destinations
Cambodia Bayon Airlines operated the following routes prior to its closure:

Routes
 Cambodia
 Phnom Penh International Airport - Siem Reap International Airport
 Siem Reap International Airport - Sihanoukville International Airport
 Phnom Penh International Airport - Sihanoukville International Airport
 Vietnam
 Phnom Penh International Airport - Ho Chi Minh City, Tan Son Nhat International Airport

In-flight services

Cambodia Bayon Airlines' MA60 airplanes have a capacity for 50 passengers and offer 48 economy seats and 2 business class seats. Full catering service is offered on both domestic and international flights. This includes a free meal and a complimentary drink. In-flight magazine is available on all flights. At Sihanoukville International Airport, a free shuttle service is offered, bringing flight guests from and to the city center.

Fleet

Current

The Cambodia Bayon Airlines fleet consists of the following aircraft at August 2019:

Cambodia Bayon Airlines has imported its second Xian MA60 aircraft from the state-owned Aviation Industry Corporation of China (AVIC); and the number of aircraft is expected to rise to five by the end of 2015. Cambodia Bayon Airlines plans to import at least 20 aircraft over 10 years, to serve its customers.

See also
 Transport in Cambodia
 List of airlines of Cambodia

References

External links

 Official website

Defunct airlines of Cambodia
Airlines established in 2014
Airlines disestablished in 2019
2019 disestablishments in Cambodia
Government-owned airlines
Cambodian companies established in 2014